Mihalis "Michael" Valkanis (Greek: Μιχάλης "Μάικελ" Βαλκάνης; born 23 August 1974) is a Greek Australian former football (soccer) player and was previously a manager of Melbourne City FC.

Club career
Valkanis rose through the ranks as a talented junior at South Melbourne to the senior team. At South Melbourne, Valkanis made 50 appearances for his boyhood club attracting the attention of overseas clubs. Valkanis would state that pulling on the South Melbourne kit for his debut was the proudest moment of his footballing career. 

Valkanis then played in the Greek League with Iraklis and most notably with Larissa where he played for five seasons and won 102 caps, and Agios Nikolaos. He played 110 games in the now-defunct National Soccer League scoring 4 goals with South Melbourne, Adelaide City and Adelaide United.

In mid-2007 Valkanis was named captain of his club side, Adelaide United, replacing Angelo Costanzo (who had been appointed as interim captain after the resignation and departure of Ross Aloisi).

Valkanis announced his intention to retire at the end of the 2008-09 A-League season in December 2008. The former captain and 100 game veteran was given a testimonial match against Newcastle Jets on 9 January 2009 where he replaced Daniel Mullen in the second half and saw Adelaide though to a 2–0 win.

International career
Valkanis' international debut, and only game for Australia, was for the Socceroos in an Asian Cup qualifier versus Kuwait at Aussie Stadium on 16 August 2006. At the time of his debut he was the second oldest debutant for Australia, behind Tommy Stankovic who debuted as a 33 year old in a friendly game against FC Torpedo Moscow. Danny Vukovic's debut later pushed Valkanis down to 3rd place on the oldest debutant list.

Managerial career
After the resignation of Adelaide United manager John Kosmina on 28 January 2013, Valkanis was appointed caretaker manager of Adelaide United for the remainder of the A-League season. Under Valkanis, Adelaide United managed to finish the A-League season in 4th place, therefore qualifying for the A-League finals. However, they were eliminated in the first round by Brisbane Roar.

In May 2016, Valkanis left Adelaide United.

In June 2016, Valkanis joined Melbourne City as the senior assistant coach to John van 't Schip.

On 3 January 2017, after the resignation of Melbourne City manager John van't Schip, Valkanis was appointed manager of the club for the remainder of the season.

On May 9, 2018, Dutch Eredivisie club PEC Zwolle announced Valkanis had been appointed assistant to manager John van't Schip on a one-year deal with a one-year option.

Personal life
Valkanis is of Greek descent. He attended De La Salle College, Malvern.

Career statistics 
(Correct as of 16 January 2009)

1 – includes A-League final series statistics
2 – includes FIFA Club World Cup statistics; AFC Champions League statistics are included in season commencing after group stages (i.e. 2008 ACL in 2008–09 A-League season etc.)

Managerial statistics

Honours
With Adelaide United:
  A-League Premiership: 2005–2006
Personal honours:
 Adelaide United Player's Player of the Year: 2005–2006

References

External links
 Oz Football profile
 Pint Culture profile
 ABC Adelaide article

1974 births
Living people
Soccer players from Melbourne
Australian people of Greek descent
Association football central defenders
Australian expatriate soccer players
Australia international soccer players
A-League Men players
Adelaide City FC players
Adelaide United FC players
Athlitiki Enosi Larissa F.C. players
South Melbourne FC players
Iraklis Thessaloniki F.C. players
Melbourne City FC non-playing staff
Australian soccer players
Naturalized citizens of Greece
PEC Zwolle non-playing staff
Australian soccer coaches
Australian expatriate soccer coaches
Greek football managers
Greek expatriate football managers
Australian expatriate sportspeople in the Netherlands
Sportsmen from Victoria (Australia)